Gil is a surname of multiple origins, including Spanish ("naive", "innocent"), Polish ("bullfinch"), and Hebrew (גיל, "joy"). Notable people with the surname include:

 Angel Gil-Ordoñez (born 1957), Spanish conductor
 Ariadna Gil (born 1969), Spanish actress
 Bárbara Gil (1930–2015), Mexican actress
 Benita Gil (1913–2015), Spanish teacher and syndicalist organizer
 Bryan Gil  I(born 2001), Spanish footballer
 Enrique Gil (born 1992), Filipino actor
 Carles Gil (born 1992), Spanish footballer
 Cherie Gil (1963–2022), Filipino actress
 David Gil (footballer) (born 1994), Spanish footballer
 David Gil (linguist) (born 1953), British linguist
 Eddie Gil (born 1944), Filipino singer and comedian
 Fred Gil (born 1985), Portuguese tennis player
 Gilberto Gil (born 1942), singer and songwriter, former Minister of Culture of Brazil
 Gus Gil (1939–2015), Venezuelan baseball player
 Jacob Gil, Israeli architect and town planner
 Jesús Gil (1933–2004), Spanish politician and businessman
 José Luis Gil (born 1957), Spanish actor
 Lucía Gil (born 1998), Spanish singer and actress
 Luis Gil (baseball) (born 1998), Dominican baseball player
 Luis Gil (soccer) (born 1993), American footballer
 Mariusz Gil (born 1983), Polish cyclist
 Mark Gil (1961–2014), Filipino actor
 Mieczysław Gil (1944–2022), Polish trade unionist and politician
 Nikki Gil (born 1987), Filipina actress
 Paweł Gil (born 1976), Polish football referee
 Radosław Gil (born 1997), Polish volleyball player
 Raul Gil (born 1938), Brazilian TV host
 Rosemarie Gil (born 1942), Filipino actress
 Teresa Gil de Vidaure (died in 1285), common-law wife of King James I of Aragon
 Tomás Gil (born 1977), Venezuelan track and road cyclist
 Uri Gil (born 1943), Israeli air force general
 Vladimir Gil (1906–1944), Soviet colonel

See also
 
Eduard Khil, whose name allegedly comes from a Spanish ancestor with the surname Gil.
Gilberto Alves, Brazilian footballer, nicknamed Gil
Gill (name)
 Gil Seong-jun (길성준, born 1977), South Korean musician

References

Spanish-language surnames
Hebrew-language surnames
Polish-language surnames